Metrolink's Riverside Line is a commuter rail line running from  Los Angeles Union Station in Downtown Los Angeles to Riverside along the Union Pacific Railroad. It runs weekday peak commuter hours only, with very little midday and reverse commute service. In 2011, the average weekday ridership was 5,161 passengers.

History
The Riverside Line, the fourth line to be introduced, was added to the Metrolink system in June 1993.  This line featured Saturday service from June 2000 until January 2002, when it was cancelled due to low ridership. As of November 2021, the line has seven trains daily on weekdays only with reverse commute service temporarily eliminated in 2019, but revived with only one train per day as of 2021.

The Riverside Line can be used to get to Ontario International Airport; the East Ontario station has an airport shuttle served by Omnitrans Bus route 81 as of 2019, including discounted Lyft fares from the station.

As Metrolink trains along the Riverside Line share tracks with Union Pacific freight trains, delays of up to 90 minutes are not uncommon. In April 2005, morning westbound trains arrived on schedule 90% of the time, while those headed east during the evening arrived on schedule only 72% of the time.

Present Decline

Ridership for the Riverside line has gradually declined following the opening of the 91/Perris Valley Line in 2002. Much of the decline in service has been a direct result of competition with the 91 Line or San Bernardino Line, or track right-of-way disputes with Union Pacific. Planning of the line's route has also come into question later in its lifetime, as the line was not redirected to the north half of the Monte Vista Subdivision to possibly construct a station to directly serve Ontario International Airport, which was heavily renovated in 1998. As a result, many riders believe Metrolink has not made the line as much of a priority for frequent usage, which has shown in the decline of trains per day in recent schedule updates. As of 2022, the Riverside Line operates seven trains on weekdays only.

Stations

Demographics
In 2011, the average weekday ridership was 5,161 passengers, with 46 percent male and 54 percent female. Eighty-nine percent of riders used the line for work commutes.

Ridership by ethnicity was evenly split:
 27% Hispanic
 27% Caucasian
 21% Asian/Pacific Islander
 19% African American
 5% other

Accidents
Several accidents have occurred on the Riverside Line since its inception. 

On December 30, 1993, around 6:15 pm, a pedestrian was killed in a collision with a Metrolink train near Bon View Avenue and Mission Boulevard (adjacent to Ontario International Airport).

In 1997, a 95-year-old, hearing-impaired man was hit and killed by a train as he crossed the Riverside Line. At 5:33 a.m. 

On January 30, 2003, a clinically depressed 37-year-old man was killed in a Metrolink train collision at a City of Industry rail crossing. The death was reported to be a suicide.

On March 9, 2005, a Union Pacific train crashed near Fullerton Road and Railroad Street, derailing 21 rail cars and disrupting Metrolink service on the Riverside Line. The crash was caused by a broken track.

On December 13, 2006, at 4:40 p.m., a Metrolink train struck a man standing on the tracks near the Pomona Freeway and 7th Avenue, between Metrolink's Montebello/Commerce and Industry stations.

On June 12, 2018, a Woman was killed after her Car was struck by a train at the Archibald Ave Crossing in Ontario.

See also
 Metro Local (Los Angeles County) – local transfer bus routes
 Riverside Transit Agency – local transfer bus routes

References

External links

 Metrolink Schedules

Metrolink (California) lines
Public transportation in Los Angeles County, California
Public transportation in Riverside County, California
Railway lines opened in 1993
Transportation in Riverside, California
1993 establishments in California
Jurupa Valley, California